Antaeotricha actista is a moth in the family Depressariidae. It was described by Edward Meyrick in 1913. It is found in Venezuela and Guyana.

The wingspan is 33–34 mm. The forewings are light fuscous, somewhat sprinkled with darker. The dorsum is indistinctly suffused with darker fuscous from near the base to near the tornus. The second discal stigma is minute and dark fuscous. The hindwings are fuscous.

References

Moths described in 1913
actista
Taxa named by Edward Meyrick
Moths of South America